Peperoncino (plural peperoncini ) is the generic Italian name for hot chili peppers, specifically some regional cultivars of the species Capsicum annuum and C. frutescens (chili pepper and Tabasco pepper, respectively). The sweet pepper is called peperone (plural peperoni) in Italian.  Like most peppers, the fruit is green or yellowish-green when young, and ripens to a red color.

In the United States, peperoncini are usually pickled, comparatively mild – most often the variety known in Italy as friggitelli, a fairly sweet cultivar of C. annuum – and commonly used (whole, sliced, or chopped) as a condiment on sandwiches, in salads, and in Italian-style or other Mediterranean-inspired dishes.

History 
The peperoncino probably came to Italy around the 15th century, when much of Italy was under Spanish dominion. It was likely an export from the new world among other plants new to Europe such as the tomato. Like the tomato, the peperoncino was first considered a decorative and possibly poisonous plant before it was adopted into Italian cuisine. It might have become popular as a food long before the cookbooks attest to its use. These cookbooks were written for the upper classes, while the peperoncino was a cheap and convenient food for the lower classes.

Pietro Andrea Mattioli first described peperoncini in 1568 and mentioned how much hotter they were than other varieties of pepper from Asia. The earliest surviving published use of peperoncino in a recipe dates to a 1694 cookbook by the Italian chef Antonio Latini.

Culinary use 

In Italian cuisine peperoncini are used with moderation and the flavour is considered more important than the heat. As a consequence the Scoville rating serves only as a rough guide to the heat, which is quite varied among the different cultivars.

The peperoncino is especially important in Calabrian cuisine. In late summer, peperoncini are stitched on wires and hung from buildings. They are left to dry in spots with sunlight and ventilation to conserve them, allowing their use in cooking until the next harvest. They are eaten whole, fried until crisp, crushed, pickled, powdered or as a paste. A typical peperoncino from Calabria rates 15,000 to 30,000 on the Scoville scale.
Notable Calabrian dishes which use peperoncini are the condiments , chili oil and the spreadable pork sausage . It is also used in dishes of other regional cuisines of Southern and Central Italy, such as the Roman-style arrabbiata sauce and the Apulian "orecchiette alle cime di rapa" (orecchiette pasta with broccoli rabe).

While most crushed red pepper (a common component of spicy Italian-style cuisine and frequently sprinkled on pizza and other dishes) in North America is today made from cayenne or jalapeño peppers common in that region, some specialty markets there supply imported Italian red peperoncino flakes.

Culture 
Since 1992 the annual Peperoncino Festival has been held in the town of Diamante in Calabria. Organized by the Accademia Italiana del Peperoncino, the festival now attracts tens of thousands of visitors. It is held for four days surrounding the first weekend of September on the town's seaside promenade. The festival has a large market where local food products made with peperoncini are sold, and hosts a peperoncino-eating contest.  Calabrian chili oil is a popular international export.

See also

Italian cuisine

Notes

References

Sources

External links 
 Accademia Italiana del Peperoncino

Cuisine of Calabria
Chili peppers
Capsicum cultivars
Italian cuisine
Cuisine of Abruzzo
Cuisine of Apulia
Cuisine of Molise
Cuisine of Lazio
Cuisine of Campania
Cuisine of Sicily
Cuisine of Basilicata